I Hear a Rhapsody is the fourth studio album by jazz pianist Josh Nelson. It was released by Steel Bird Music on June 21, 2009.

Track listing

Personnel
 Josh Nelson - Piano, Fender Rhodes, Trumpet, Voive
 Ben Wendel - Tenor Saxophone, Bassoon (on tracks 2 & 4)
 Tom Catanzaro - Tenor and Soprano Saxophone (on tracks 6, 7, 10)
 Charles Altura - Guitar (on tracks 6, 7, 10)
 Hamilton Price - Bass
 Sam Minaie - Bass (on tracks 2, 4, 8)
 Kevin Kanner - Drums, Percussion
 Zach Harmon - Drums, Percussion (on tracks 2, 4, 8)

References

Josh Nelson albums
2009 albums
Instrumental albums